In mathematics, Jacobsthal sums are finite sums of Legendre symbols related to Gauss sums.

Definition

The Jacobsthal sum is given by

References

Further reading
 

Number theory